|}

The Snowdrop Fillies' Stakes is a Listed flat horse race in Great Britain open to  fillies and mares aged four years or older. It is run over a distance of 1 mile (1,609 metres) at Kempton Park in April.

The race was first run in 2004.

Winners

See also 
Horse racing in Great Britain
List of British flat horse races

References 

Racing Post:

Kempton Park Racecourse
Flat races in Great Britain
Mile category horse races for fillies and mares
Recurring sporting events established in 2004
2004 establishments in England